and  are basic memory management system calls used in Unix and Unix-like operating systems to control the amount of memory allocated to the data segment of the process.

Description
The brk and sbrk calls dynamically change the amount of space allocated for the data segment of the calling process. The change is made by resetting the program break of the process, which determines the maximum space that can be allocated. The program break is the address of the first location beyond the current end of the data region. The amount of available space increases as the break value increases. The available space is initialized to a value of zero, unless the break is lowered and then increased, as it may reuse the same pages in some unspecified way. The break value can be automatically rounded up to a size appropriate for the memory management architecture.

They were removed in POSIX.1-2001.

Function signatures and behavior
#include <unistd.h>

int brk(void* end_data_segment);
void *sbrk(intptr_t increment);
 is used to adjust the  program break value by adding a possibly negative size, while  is used to set the break value to the value of a pointer. Set  parameter to zero to fetch the current value of the program break.

Upon successful completion, the  subroutine returns a value of 0, and the  subroutine returns the prior value of the program break (if the available space is increased then this prior value also points to the start of the new area).

Not every Unix-like system entertains the concept of having the user control the data segment. On first call an area of exactly this large is allocated to hold the simulated segment.

Error codes
The error  is set and the allocated space remains unchanged if one or more of the following are true:
 The requested change allocates more space than is allowed by a system-imposed maximum.
 The requested change sets the break value to a value greater than or equal to the start address of any attached shared memory segment.

See also 

 Exec (computing)
 Memory address#Address space in application programming

References

Memory management
Operating system APIs